Lymphokines are a subset of cytokines that are produced by a type of immune cell known as a lymphocyte. They are protein mediators typically produced by T cells to direct the immune system response by signaling between its cells.  Lymphokines have many roles, including the attraction of other immune cells, including macrophages and other lymphocytes, to an infected site and their subsequent activation to prepare them to mount an immune response. Circulating lymphocytes can detect a very small concentration of lymphokine and then move up the concentration gradient towards where the immune response is required. Lymphokines aid B cells to produce antibodies.

Important lymphokines secreted by the T helper cell include:
 Interleukin 2
 Interleukin 3
 Interleukin 4
 Interleukin 5
 Interleukin 6
 Granulocyte-macrophage colony-stimulating factor
 Interferon-gamma

References

External links
 

Cytokines